During the 1995–96 season 'Associazione Sportiva Bari competed in Serie A and Coppa Italia.

Summary 

During the summer before 1995-96 Serie A,  the head office “biancorossa” sold two young stars, Emiliano Bigica and Lorenzo Amoruso, to Fiorentina for almost 8 million dollars. Regarding these operations club managing director  Carlo Regalia states that was for balancing the budget. Also transferred out Sandro Tovalieri, to Serie A newcomers Atalanta B.C.

Arrivals to the “pugliese” club were Swedish forward Kennet Andersson, known as striker with 5 goals scored in 1994 FIFA World Cup (Sweden reached the third place in that competition), and Abel Xavier, right back from Benfica and Portugal international.

In 1995-96 Coppa Italia the “galletti” are defeated in second round by newcomer trainer Carlo Ancelotti and his squad Reggiana, due to a 2–0 in Emilia-Romagna.

In League, after obtained only eight points during the first seven rounds, included a 1–0 victory over Milan of Fabio Capello, the biancorossi were defeated five times row causing the firing between 12ª and 13ª round of manager Giuseppe Materazzi ; arriving to the bench  was Eugenio Fascetti. The debut of the new head coach was a shocking loss of 7–1 in Cremona, with Portuguese Abel Xavier playing as sweeper, delivered a bad performance. Then, a month of irregular results, with 8 points won in 4 matches included a  4–1 victory against Internazionale and a draw 1–1 in Torino against incumbent champions Juventus on round 17 closing the first part of the campaign in 16th place, 1 point behind Torino and in danger to compete in 1996-97 Serie B.

During Autumn the club bought Swedish midfielder Klas Ingesson from Sheffield Wednesday and young defender Roberto Ripa from Udinese Calcio.

In the next 8 matches, the team draw 4 of them included Torino and Piacenza direct rivals for salvation, and lost the other games. In 26ª and 27ª round, Bari won in Bergamo against Atalanta and won in home against Padova Calcio. After this, also in stadio San Nicola, the “pugliesi” are defeated 1-2 by A.S. Roma between controversial decisions by referee  Robert Boggi against Bari. The irregular results continued; the team was classified to 1996-97 Serie B after a defeat 3–0 in Stadio Giuseppe Meazza against Inter. The squad of Fascetti draw 2–2 with Juventus in the last game of the season closing in 16th place in the League table.

The campaign is the first in Serie A in which a team was relegated to Serie B and the same time the “capocannoniere” topscorer of the tournament played in that squad, center forward Igor Protti scored 24 goals for Bari sharing the individual trophy with SS Lazio striker Giuseppe Signori, who scored more goals by penalties. The other forward of Bari, Kennet Andersson, scored 12 goals and was crucial giving a lot of assists to Protti.

However, in a bizarre season with a powerful offensive duo, the defense was crucial to relegation with 71 goals allowed in 34 matches, only surpassed by last placed Padova (79).

Squad 

(Captain)

Transfers

Autumn

Competitions

Serie A

League table

Results by round

Matches

Statistics

Players Statistics

References

Bibliography

External links 
 
 http://www.calcio.com/tutte_le_partite/ita-serie-a-1995-1996/

S.S.C. Bari seasons
Bari